Camel's Hump State Park is a state park in the U.S. state of Vermont. The park straddles the northern Green Mountains in an area bounded by Vermont Route 17 on the south and the Winooski River on the north.

Public access

Camel's Hump State Park has no phone, no visitor facilities, and no entry fee. The park is publicly accessible from numerous undeveloped parking lots and trails. The most popular access points are the Burrows Trailhead east of Huntington and the Monroe Trailhead south of Duxbury. In 2016, almost 26,000 visitors signed the trail registers at these two trailheads. Parking is also available along Vermont Route 17 at Appalachian Gap in Buels Gore and along Duxbury Road west of Duxbury, but these parking areas are much further from Camel's Hump and therefore less popular.

At the Monroe Trailhead, the Camel's Hump View Trail is a  universally accessible trail with easy grades, a wide path, and several benches along the way. From the trail, there is a fine view of Camel's Hump to the west.

Trails

The Long Trail, a  hiking trail running the length of Vermont, enters the southern edge of the park at Appalachian Gap along Vermont Route 17, winding northward  along the ridge of the Green Mountains before reaching a footbridge that crosses the Winooski River on the park's northern boundary. This section of the Long Trail traverses the summit of Camel's Hump and other significant features:

The Catamount Trail, a  cross-country ski trail, enters the southeastern corner of the park along Vermont Route 17.

VAST 17 intersects both the Long Trail and the Catamount Trail at Huntington Gap.

Phen Basin in the southeast corner of Camel's Hump State Park is a popular mountain biking destination. There are numerous trails in the area including the Chain Gang Trail and the East Loop Trail. Parking is available at the end of Bassett Hill Road and at the end of Stagecoach Road, both in Fayston.

Camping

Camping in Camel's Hump State Park is limited. Additional camping facilities are available at nearby Little River State Park.

The Green Mountain Club operates two shelters (3-sided) and two lodges (4-sided) on the Long Trail (from south to north): Birch Glen Camp, Cowles Cove Shelter, Montclair Glen Lodge, and Bamforth Ridge Shelter. There is a nominal fee for overnight use of a shelter or lodge as well as a 2-night limit. Reservations are not accepted.

Each shelter and lodge has at least one wooden platform nearby for campers. The only dedicated tent camping area in the park is the Hump Brook Tenting Area with 30 tent sites. Overnight use of the latter requires a fee.

Primitive camping is allowed in Camel's Hump State Park below , away from trails, roads, and water, in accordance with state primitive camping guidelines and Leave No Trace principles.

History

During the late 1800s and early 1900s, the forests of Camel’s Hump State Park were extensively logged. Except for some remote pockets at the highest elevations, Camel’s Hump was almost completely denuded by the end of the nineteenth century. To make matters worse, a great fire burned thousands of acres in 1903, sparing some of the forests along the western flank of Camel’s Hump but burning almost everywhere else. Many of the trees that now cover the eastern flank of Camel’s Hump had their start in the aftermath of that fire.

In 1911, he sold these lands (for one dollar) to the State of Vermont. The deed declared: 

In accordance with Battell's wishes, in 1969 the Vermont legislature established Camel's Hump Forest Reserve and designated the state lands in the reserve as Camel's Hump State Park. An ecological area was created "to protect scarce and rare plants, to preserve the natural habitat, and to maintain the wilderness aspect" of the park. The ecological area includes the land conveyed by Battell in 1911.

See also

 Camel's Hump State Forest

Bibliography

References

State parks of Vermont
Protected areas of Chittenden County, Vermont
Protected areas of Washington County, Vermont
Duxbury, Vermont
Huntington, Vermont
Bolton, Vermont
Fayston, Vermont
Buels Gore, Vermont
1969 establishments in Vermont
Protected areas established in 1969